Consumers Credit Union is a credit union founded in 1951 and is headquartered in Kalamazoo, Michigan.

History 
Consumers Credit Union was founded in 1951 under the name Kalamazoo Consumers Power Company (KCPC) Employees Federal Credit Union, a credit union for employees of Consumers Energy. Consumers became a state-chartered credit union in 1964 and its services grew to include employees of the Palisades nuclear power plant in Covert, Michigan.

Kit Snyder was named the CEO in 1984. The name changed in 1987 to its current Consumers Credit Union. In 1988, they began allowing employees of companies located in the city of Kalamazoo to become members. 

In 2017, Consumers Credit Union moved their headquarters into The Groves Engineering Business Technology Park in Kalamazoo.

Awards and recognition

References

Credit unions based in Michigan
Companies based in Kalamazoo, Michigan
Banks established in 1951
1951 establishments in Michigan